Map of China is a 2008 sculpture by Chinese artist Ai Weiwei.  The sculpture has been reported as resembling a park bench or tree trunk, but its cross-section is a map of China.  It is four metres long and weighs 635 kilograms. It is made from wood salvaged from Qing Dynasty temples.

References

2008 sculptures
Ai Weiwei
Maps in art